Blue Bird Group (branded as Bluebird) is an Indonesian transportation company based in Jakarta. Established in 1972, the company is known for its Blue Bird taxicab service as well as other transportation services.

History 
Blue Bird Group was founded by Mutiara Fatimah Djokosoetono, wife of Jakarta-based College of Policing (STIK) and College of Military Law (AHM) founder and first dean of Faculty of Law of University of Indonesia Djokosoetono, and her two sons Chandra Suharto and Purnomo Prawiro. They founded a non-argo taxi company Chandra Taksi (named after Chandra Suharto), considered as the predecessor of Blue Bird. Chandra Taksi started its operation from two cars granted by the people at PTIK and AHM. Chandra Taksi was considered "dark taxi" (taksi gelap) because the company utilised private cars for taxi service.

They officially founded Blue Bird in 1972, with their other business partners after had obtained permit from Jakarta Office of Transportation. Initially had the armada of 25 taxi, the company had had 500 taxis in 1978 and jumped into 2,000 in 1985. Its first Holden Torana fleet is currently in display at Blue Bird headquarters. Blue Bird pioneered several innovations in Indonesian taxi industry, including argometer-based tariff, air conditioned taxi, and GPS system installation.

In 2011, Blue Bird launched its mobile app. In the same year it was the first taxi company in Indonesia who gave its mobile reservation via Blackberry. In 2014, Blue Bird went public on Indonesia Stock Exchange.

In 2017, Blue Bird collaborated with transportation technology company Gojek to deliver Go-Blue Bird which enables customers to request Blue Bird taxis directly in Gojek app.

Business units 
The company is known for its four land transportation services: Blue Bird regular taxis, Big Bird buses, Silver Bird executive taxis, and Golden Bird rent-a-car. Blue Bird Group also has expanded further into other business such as logistics, property industry, heavy equipments, and IT consultation services.

See also 
 Express Group Taxi

References

Taxi companies
Indonesian companies established in 1972
Transport companies established in 1972
1972 establishments in Indonesia
2014 initial public offerings
Transport companies of Indonesia
Companies based in Jakarta
Companies listed on the Indonesia Stock Exchange